Lahnech (English: The Snake) is a 2017 Moroccan comedy film directed by Driss Mrini. The film was screened at multiple national film festivals and had a successful run at the box office.

Synopsis 
Farid (Aziz Dades) is being monitored by the authorities for usurping the identity of a police officer. Little does he know that Officer Bouchra (Majdouline Idrissi), the officer sent out to take him into custody, has fallen in love with him.

Cast 

 Aziz Dades
 Majdouline Idrissi
 Fadila Benmoussa
 Mouhcine Malzi
 Abdelghani Sannak

References 

Moroccan comedy films
2017 films